Billy Burns may refer to:

 Billy Burns (baseball) (born 1989), baseball player
 Billy Burns (footballer) (1907–?), Association football player
 Billy Burns (rugby league) (born 1998), Australian rugby league player
 Billy Burns (rugby union) (born 1994), Irish rugby union player
 Billy Burns (runner) (born 1969), American runner
 Billy Burns (trombonist) (c. 1904–1963), American jazz trombonist
 Billy Joe Burns (born 1989), footballer from Northern Ireland

See also
Bill Burns (disambiguation)
William Burns (disambiguation)